Oswald Veblen (June 24, 1880 – August 10, 1960) was an American mathematician, geometer and topologist, whose work found application in atomic physics and the theory of relativity. He proved the Jordan curve theorem in 1905; while this was long considered the first rigorous proof of the theorem, many now also consider Camille Jordan's original proof rigorous.

Early life
Veblen was born in Decorah, Iowa. His parents were Andrew Anderson Veblen  (1848–1932), Professor of Physics at the University of Iowa, and Kirsti (Hougen) Veblen (1851–1908). Veblen's uncle was Thorstein Veblen, noted economist and sociologist.

Oswald went to school in Iowa City. He did his undergraduate studies at the University of Iowa, where he received an AB in 1898, and Harvard University, where he was awarded a second BA in 1900.  For his graduate studies, he went to study mathematics at the University of Chicago, where he obtained a PhD in 1903.  His dissertation, A System of Axioms for Geometry was written under the supervision of E. H. Moore.  During World War I, Veblen served first as a captain, later as a major in the United States Army.

Career
Veblen taught mathematics at Princeton University from 1905 to 1932.  In 1926, he was named Henry B. Fine Professor of Mathematics.   In 1932, he helped organize the Institute for Advanced Study in Princeton, resigning his professorship to become the first professor at the Institute that same year. He kept his professorship at the Institute until he was made emeritus in 1950.

During his years in Princeton, Veblen and his wife, Elizabeth M D Richardson, accumulated land along the Princeton Ridge.  In 1957 they donated  to establish the Herrontown Woods Arboretum, the first and one of the largest nature preserves in Princeton, New Jersey.

Veblen was a Plenary Speaker of the ICM in 1928 in Bologna and in 1936 in Oslo.

Veblen died in Brooklin, Maine, in 1960 at age 80. After his death the American Mathematical Society created an award in his name, called the Oswald Veblen Prize in Geometry. It is awarded every three years, and is the most prestigious award in recognition of outstanding research in geometry.

Accomplishments
During his career, Veblen made important contributions in topology and in projective and differential geometries, including results important in modern physics. He introduced the Veblen axioms for projective geometry and proved the Veblen–Young theorem. He introduced the Veblen functions of ordinals and used an extension of them to define the small and large Veblen ordinals. In World War II he was involved in overseeing ballistics work at the Aberdeen Proving Ground that involved early modern computing machines, in particular supporting the proposal for  creation of the pioneering ENIAC electronic digital computer. He also published a paper in 1912 on the four-color conjecture.

Personal life
In 1908, he married Elizabeth Richardson, the sister of British physicist Owen Willans Richardson and sister-in-law of American physicist  Clinton Joseph Davisson.

Veblen Research Instructorship
The Veblen Research Instructorship is a three-year position  offered by the Department of Mathematics at Princeton University and the Institute for Advanced Study. This position was established in 1998 and offered each year to outstanding candidates in pure and applied mathematics who have received their PhD within the last three years.

The Veblen instructors are Members of the Institute for Advanced Study and regular faculty members at Princeton University. The first and third year of the instructorship are spent at Princeton University and carry regular teaching responsibilities. The second year is spent at the Institute and dedicated to independent research of the instructor's choice.

Books by O. Veblen
 Introduction to infinitesimal analysis; functions of one real variable with N. J. Lennes (John Wiley & Sons, 1907)
 Projective geometry with John Wesley Young (Ginn and Co., Vol. 1, 1910; Vol. 2, 1918)
 Analysis Situs (American Mathematical Society, 1922; 2nd edn. 1931)
 Invariants of Quadratic Differential Forms (Cambridge University Press, 1927)
 The Foundations of Differential Geometry with J. H. C. Whitehead (Cambridge University Press, 1932)
 Projektive Relativitätstheorie (Springer Verlag, 1933)

See also
Hughes plane
Finite geometry
Ordered geometry
Hall plane of order 9

References

External links

 
  Obituary and Bibliography of Oswald Veblen (also available  here.)
 
 
 "Projective relativity theory," transl. by D. H. Delphenich
 

20th-century American mathematicians
Topologists
Geometers
Ballistics experts
1880 births
1960 deaths
Institute for Advanced Study faculty
People from Decorah, Iowa
University of Iowa alumni
Harvard University alumni
University of Chicago alumni
Princeton University faculty
American people of Norwegian descent
Presidents of the American Mathematical Society
Mathematicians from Iowa